The 2000 Malta International Tournament (known as the Rothmans Tournament for sponsorship reasons) was the tenth edition of the Malta International Tournament. The tournament, held between 6 February and 10 February 2000, was contested by Malta, Albania, Andorra and Azerbaijan.

Matches

Winner

Statistics

Goalscorers

See also 
China Cup
Cyprus International Football Tournament

References 

1999–2000 in Maltese football
1999–2000 in Azerbaijani football
1999–2000 in Albanian football
1999–2000 in Andorran football
2000